Bhagur is a municipal council in Nashik District in the state of Maharashtra, India. Bhagur is the birthplace of Indian independence movement activist Vinayak Damodar Savarkar. It is located 4 km from Deolali and 22 km from Nashik.Bhagur is a scenic town replete with lush, rolling hills and pleasant weather, all of which make it a great weekend getaway from Nashik. An hour-long drive promises splendid views of the hill range, as well as the verdant valleys laid out below. While you are in town, make some time for Bhagur Devi Temple, which attracts a large number of devotees. This small yet beautiful temple is a must-see for those who love offbeat attractions, and is a great way to get acquainted with warm locals and purohits of Bhagur. Seek blessings of the goddess as you explore the premises of the temple, or sit in the courtyard and grab a moment of peaceful meditation.

Bhagur finds some significance in the Indian freedom movement as it was the birthplace of the great freedom fighter Veer Savarkar. It has many tourists attracting places as it is situated on the bank of river darna. There is a beautiful park with swimming facilities on the shore of river with a beautiful ram temple with great scenery. The birth residence of Swatantra veer Vinayak Damodar Savarkar is newly renovated and it is a great tourist site to visit. It has many structures related to freedom struggle and many memorable photos of freedom movement.

Demographics

Administration
The city is administered by the Bhagur Municipal Council, which was established in 1925.

References

About bhagur
According to Census 2011 information the location code or village code of Bhagur Rural village is 551014. Bhagur Rural village is located in Nashik tehsil of Nashik district in Maharashtra, India. It is situated 20km away from sub-district headquarter Nashik (tehsildar office) and 20km away from district headquarter Nashik. As per 2009 stats, Lahvit is the gram panchayat of Bhagur Rural village.

The total geographical area of village is 2582 hectares. Bhagur Rural has a total population of 276 peoples, out of which male population is 143 while female population is 133. There are about 49 houses in bhagur rural village.

When it comes to administration, Bhagur Rural village is administrated by a sarpanch who is elected representative of the village by the local elections. As per 2019 stats, Bhagur Rural village comes under Devlali assembly constituency & Nashik parliamentary constituency. Bhagur is nearest town to bhagur rural for all major economic activities, which is approximately 2km away.

Cities and towns in Nashik district